The Road Eternal (2011) is the second collaborative album by American ambient musician Steve Roach and Norwegian musician Erik Wøllo.
This is the follow up of their album collaboration Stream of Thought (Projekt, 2009). Electronic music with six rhythmic sequencer-based tracks intersperse with ambient zones and soaring electric guitar textures.

Reception 
AllMusic rated the album a 3.5 of 5, concluding "another fine demonstration of the duo's abilities".

Track listing

Personnel 
Adapted from Discogs
 Erik Wøllo – composer, mixing, producer, electric guitar, synthesizer, photography
 Steve Roach – composer, mixing, producer, mastering, synthesizer, electronics, loops, performer, photography
 Sam Rosenthal – graphic design

References

External links 
 The Road Eternal at Bandcamp
 The Road Eternal at Discogs

2011 albums
Steve Roach (musician) albums
Projekt Records albums